WMYM (990 AM) is a radio station licensed to Kendall, Florida, serving the Miami metropolitan area with a Spanish language talk format, simulcasting WWFE.

History

WFAB "La Fabulosa" broadcast a Spanish-language format on 990 from 1962 to 1977; the station, however, lost its license due to fraudulent billing practices. The demise of WFAB led to a multi-year fight for the license, ultimately won by Community Broadcasting Company. The unbuilt construction permit was sold to W.R.A. Broadcasting in 1996 and went on air in 1997 was WFBA. (The WFAB call letters had been assigned in the intervening 20 years to a station in Puerto Rico.) While WFAB's tower site used a six-tower inline array, WMYM uses a six-tower parallelogram; the pattern had to be tightened because of an upgrade to WHSR, a Pompano Beach station on 980.

In 1999, Disney acquired WFAB for its Radio Disney children's network, launching the format on September 17, 1999. The next day, ABC Radio changed 990 AM's calls to WMYM (as in Disney character Mickey Mouse). On August 13, 2014, Disney put WMYM and twenty-two other Radio Disney stations up for sale, in order to focus more on digital distribution of the Radio Disney network.

On February 12, 2015, Enrique Cusco's Actualidad Radio Group (owner of the Spanish news/talk trimulcast WLVJ, WURN and WURN-FM) announced that it would acquire WMYM (from ABC Radio/Radio Disney Group), for a price of $2,100,000. The sale was completed on May 29, 2015

The station discontinued its Radio Disney affiliation and went silent on June 11, 2015. WMYM returned to the air, and switched to sports programming from ESPN Deportes Radio, which effectively continued Disney's programming of the station. WMYM served as the flagship station for ESPN Deportes Radio's programming.

After ESPN Deportes Radio was discontinued September 8, 2019, WMYM became the flagship station of the newly launched Unanimo Deportes Radio network.

Effective January 6, 2023, Salem Media Group acquired WMYM and translator W254DT from Actualidad Radio Group for $5 million.

References

External links
WMYM official website

Cuban-American culture in Miami
Hispanic and Latino American culture in Miami
MYM
MYM
Sports radio stations in the United States
Former subsidiaries of The Walt Disney Company
Salem Media Group properties